Henk Aertsen (born 1943, Enkhuizen) is a now-retired professor of Old English and Middle English language and literature at the Vrije Universiteit, Amsterdam. He is the editor (with Alasdair MacDonald) of Companion to Middle English Romance (Amsterdam, VU Press, 1990), and (with Rolf Bremmer) of Companion to Old English Poetry (Amsterdam: VU Press, 1994).

References

External links
Aertsen at the VU

1943 births
Living people
Anglo-Saxon studies scholars
Linguists from the Netherlands
Academic staff of Vrije Universiteit Amsterdam
People from Enkhuizen